Di-tert-butylzinc is a compound with the formula ZnC8H18.  This compound is used as a meta activating reagent in the syntheses of N,N-dimethyl-3-iodoaniline from N,N-dimethylaniline.

Synthesis 
Di-tert-butylzinc is obtained from the reaction between tert-butyllithium and zinc chloride.

2 (CH3)3CLi + ZnCl2 → Zn(C(CH3)3)2 + 2 LiCl

References

Organozinc compounds
Tert-butyl compounds